The 1880s (pronounced "eighteen-eighties") was a decade of the Gregorian calendar that began on January 1, 1880, and ended on December 31, 1889.

The period was characterized in general by economic growth and prosperity in many parts of the world, especially Europe and the Americas, with the emergence of modern cities signified by the foundation of many long-lived corporations, franchises, and brands and the introduction of the skyscraper. The decade was a part of the Gilded Age (1874–1907) in the United States and the Victorian Era in the British Empire. It also occurred at the height of the Second Industrial Revolution and saw numerous developments in science and a sudden proliferation of electrical technologies, particularly in mass transit and telecommunications.

Politics and wars

Wars

 Aceh War (1873–1904)
 War of the Pacific (1879–1884)
 First Boer War (1880–1881)
 Mahdist War (1881–1899)
 1882 Anglo-Egyptian War (1882)
 13 September 1882 — British troops occupy Cairo, and Egypt becomes a British protectorate.
 Sino-French War (1884–1885)
 Serbo-Bulgarian War (1885)

Internal conflicts
 American Indian Wars (Intermittently from 1622 to 1918)
 20 July 1881 — Sioux chief Sitting Bull leads the last of his fugitive people in surrender to United States troops at Fort Buford in Montana.
 Frequent lynchings of African Americans in Southern United States during the years 1880–1890

Colonization
 France colonizes Indochina (1883)
 German colonization (1887)
 Increasing colonial interest and conquest in Africa leads representatives from Britain, France, Portugal, Germany, Belgium, Italy and Spain to divide Africa into regions of colonial influence at the Berlin Conference. This would be followed over the next few decades by conquest of almost the entirety of the remaining uncolonised parts of the continent, broadly along the lines determined. (1889)

Prominent political events
 3 August 1881: The Pretoria Convention peace treaty is signed, officially ending the war between the Boers and Britain.
 3 May 1882: The Chinese Exclusion Act was signed into law by President Chester A. Arthur.
 1884: International Meridian Conference in Washington D.C., held to determine the Prime Meridian of the world.
 1884–1885: Berlin Conference, when the western powers divided Africa.
 The United States had five Presidents during the decade, the most since the 1840s. They were Rutherford B. Hayes, James A. Garfield, Chester A. Arthur, Grover Cleveland and Benjamin Harrison.

Disasters
 May to August, 1883: Krakatoa, a volcano in Indonesia, erupted cataclysmically; 36,000 people were killed, the majority being killed by the resulting tsunami.
September 1887: The Yellow river flooded and killed about 900,000 people.

Assassinations and attempts

Prominent assassinations, targeted killings, and assassination attempts include:

 13 March 1881 – Assassination of the Tsar of the Russian Empire Alexander II of Russia.
 19 September 1881 – James A. Garfield, 20th President of the United States (See also James A. Garfield assassination)
 2 March 1882 – Roderick Maclean fails to assassinate Queen Victoria.
 3 April 1882 – Bob Ford assassinates Jesse James, legendary outlaw.
 6 May 1882 – Lord Frederick Cavendish, Chief Secretary for Ireland, assassinated in the Phoenix Park by the Invincibles.

Science and technology

Technology
1880: Oliver Heaviside of Camden Town, London, England receives a patent for the coaxial cable. In 1887, Heaviside introduced the concept of loading coils. In the 1890s, Mihajlo Idvorski Pupin would both create the loading coils and receive a patent of them, failing to credit Heaviside's work.
 1880–1882: Development and commercial production of electric lighting was underway. Thomas Edison of Milan, Ohio, established Edison Illuminating Company on December 17, 1880. Based at New York City, it was the pioneer company of the electrical power industry. Edison's system was based on creating a central power plant equipped with electrical generators. Copper electrical wires would then connect the station with other buildings, allowing for electric power distribution. Pearl Street Station was the first central power plant in the United States. It was located at 255–257 Pearl Street in Manhattan on a site measuring 50 by 100 feet, just south of Fulton Street. It began with one direct current generator, and it started generating electricity on September 4, 1882, serving an initial load of 400 lamps at 85 customers. By 1884, Pearl Street Station was serving 508 customers with 10,164 lamps.
1880–1886: Charles F. Brush of Euclid, Ohio, and Brush Electric Light Company installed carbon arc lights along Broadway, New York City. A small generating station was established at Manhattan's 25th Street. The electric arc lights went into regular service on December 20, 1880. The new Brooklyn Bridge of 1883 had seventy arc lamps installed in it. By 1886, there was a reported number of 1,500 arc lights installed in Manhattan.
1880–1883: James Wimshurst of Poplar, London, England invents the Wimshurst Machine.
1881–1885: Stefan Drzewiecki of Podolia, Russian Empire finishes his submarine-building project (which had begun in 1879). The crafts were constructed at Nevskiy Shipbuilding and Machinery works at Saint Petersburg. Altogether, 50 units were delivered to the Ministry of War. They were reportedly deployed as part of the defense of Kronstadt and Sevastopol. In 1885, the submarines were transferred to the Imperial Russian Navy. They were soon declared "ineffective" and discarded. By 1887, Drzewiecki was designing submarines for the French Third Republic.
1881–1883: John Philip Holland of Liscannor, County Clare, Ireland builds the Fenian Ram submarine for the Fenian Brotherhood. During extensive trials, Holland made numerous dives and test-fired the gun using dummy projectiles. However, due to funding disputes within the Irish Republican Brotherhood and disagreement over payments from the IRB to Holland, the IRB stole  Fenian Ram and the Holland III prototype in November 1883.
1882: William Edward Ayrton of London, England and John Perry of Garvagh, County Londonderry, Ireland build an electric tricycle. It reportedly had a range of 10 to 25 miles, powered by a lead acid battery. A significant innovation of the vehicle was its use of electric lights, here playing the role of headlamps.
1882: James Atkinson of Hampstead, London, England invented the Atkinson cycle engine. By use of variable engine strokes from a complex crankshaft, Atkinson was able to increase the efficiency of his engine, at the cost of some power, over traditional Otto-cycle engines.
1882: Schuyler Wheeler of Massachusetts invented the two-blade electric fan. Henry W. Seely of New York invented the electric safety iron. Both were arguably among the earliest small domestic electrical appliances to appear.
1882–1883: John Hopkinson of Manchester, England patents the three-phase electric power system in 1882. In 1883 Hopkinson showed mathematically that it was possible to connect two alternating current dynamos in parallel — a problem that had long bedeviled electrical engineers.
1883: Charles Fritts, an American inventor, creates the first working solar cell. The energy conversion efficiency of these early devices was less than 1%. Denounced as a fraud in the US for "generating power without consuming matter, thus violating the laws of physics".
1883–1885: Josiah H. L. Tuck, an American inventor, works in his own submarine designs. His 1883 model was created in Delameter Iron Works. It was 30-feet long, "all-electric and had vertical and horizontal propellers clutched to the same shaft, with a 20-feet breathing pipe and an airlock for a diver." His 1885 model, called the "Peacemaker", was larger. It used "a caustic soda patent boiler to power a 14-HP Westinghouse steam engine". She managed a number of short trips within the New York Harbor area. The Peacemaker had a submerged endurance of 5 hours. Tuck did not benefit from his achievement. His family feared that the inventor was squandering his fortune on the Peacemaker. They had him committed to an insane asylum by the end of the decade.
1883–1886: John Joseph Montgomery of Yuba City, California, starts his attempts at early flight. In 1884, using a glider designed and built in 1883, Montgomery made the "first heavier-than-air human-carrying aircraft to achieve controlled piloted flight" in the Western Hemisphere. This glider had a curved parabolic wing surface. He reportedly made a glide of "considerable length" from Otay Mesa, San Diego, California, his first successful flight and arguably the first successful one in the United States. In 1884–1885, Montgomery tested a second monoplane glider with flat wings. The innovation in design was "hinged surfaces at the rear of the wings to maintain lateral balance". These were early forms of Aileron. After experimentation with a water tank and smoke chamber to understand the nature of flow over surfaces, in 1886, Montgomery designed a third glider with fully rotating wings as pitcherons. He then turned to theoretic research towards the development of a manuscript "Soaring Flight" in 1896.
1884–1885: On August 9, 1884, La France, a French Army airship, makes its maiden flight. Launched by Charles Renard and Arthur Constantin Krebs. Krebs piloted the first fully controlled free-flight with the La France. It was the first full round trip flight with a landing on the starting point. On its seven flights in 1884 and 1885 the La France dirigible returned five times to its starting point. "La France was the first airship that could return to its starting point in a light wind. Its battery-powered motor "produced 7.5 horsepower (5.6 kilowatts). This motor was later replaced with one that produced 8.5 horsepower (6.3 kilowatts)."
1884: Paul Gottlieb Nipkow of Lębork, Kingdom of Prussia, German Empire invents the Nipkow disk, an image scanning device. It was the basis of his patent method of translating visual images to electronic impulses, transmit said impulses to another device and successfully reassemble the impulses to visual images. Nipkow used a selenium photoelectric cell. Nipkow proposed and patented the first "near-practicable" electromechanical television system in 1884. Although he never built a working model of the system, Nipkow's spinning disk design became a common television image rasterizer used up to 1939.
1884: Alexander Mozhaysky of Kotka, Grand Duchy of Finland, Russian Empire makes the second known "powered, assisted take off of a heavier-than-air craft carrying an operator". His steam-powered monoplane took off at Krasnoye Selo, near Saint Petersburg, making a hop and "covering between 65 and 100 feet". The monoplane had a failed landing, with one of its wings destroyed and serious damages. It was never rebuilt. Later Soviet propaganda would overstate Mozhaysky's accomplishment while downplaying the failed landing. The Grand Soviet Encyclopedia called this "the first true flight of a heavier-than-air machine in history".
1884–1885: Ganz Company engineers Károly Zipernowsky, Ottó Bláthy and Miksa Déri had determined that open-core devices were impracticable, as they were incapable of reliably regulating voltage. In their joint patent application for the "Z.B.D." transformers, they described the design of two with no poles: the "closed-core" and the "shell-core" transformers. In the closed-core type, the primary and secondary windings were wound around a closed iron ring; in the shell type, the windings were passed through the iron core. In both designs, the magnetic flux linking the primary and secondary windings traveled almost entirely within the iron core, with no intentional path through air. When employed in electric distribution systems, this revolutionary design concept would finally make it technically and economically feasible to provide electric power for lighting in homes, businesses and public spaces. Bláthy had suggested the use of closed-cores, Zipernowsky the use of shunt connections, and Déri had performed the experiments. Electrical and electronic systems the world over continue to rely on the principles of the original Z.B.D. transformers. The inventors also popularized the word "transformer" to describe a device for altering the EMF of an electric current, although the term had already been in use by 1882.
1884–1885: John Philip Holland and Edmund Zalinski, having formed the "Nautilus Submarine Boat Company", start working on a new submarine. The so-called "Zalinsky boat" was constructed in Hendrick's Reef (former Fort Lafayette), Bay Ridge in (ray) or (rayacus the 3rd) New York City borough of Brooklyn. "The new, cigar-shaped submarine was 50 feet long with a maximum beam of eight feet. To save money, the hull was largely of wood, framed with iron hoops, and again, a Brayton-cycle engine provided motive power." The project was plagued by a "shoestring budget" and Zalinski mostly rejecting Holland's ideas on improvements. The submarine was ready for launching in September, 1885. "During the launching itself, a section of the ways collapsed under the weight of the boat, dashing the hull against some pilings and staving in the bottom. Although the submarine was repaired and eventually carried out several trial runs in lower New York Harbor, by the end of 1886 the Nautilus Submarine Boat Company was no more, and the salvageable remnants of the Zalinski Boat were sold to reimburse the disappointed investors." Holland would not create another submarine to 1893.
1885: Galileo Ferraris of Livorno Piemonte, Kingdom of Italy reaches the concept of a rotating magnetic field. He applied it to a new motor. "Ferraris devised a motor using electromagnets at right angles and powered by alternating currents that were 90° out of phase, thus producing a revolving magnetic field. The motor, the direction of which could be reversed by reversing its polarity, proved the solution to the last remaining problem in alternating-current motors. The principle made possible the development of the asynchronous, self-starting electric motor that is still used today. Believing that the scientific and intellectual values of new developments far outstripped material values, Ferraris deliberately did not patent his invention; on the contrary, he demonstrated it freely in his own laboratory to all comers." He published his findings in 1888. By then, Nikola Tesla had independently reached the same concept and was seeking a patent.
1885: Nikolay Bernardos and Karol Olszewski of Broniszów were granted a patent for their Electrogefest, an "electric arc welder with a carbon electrode". Introducing a method of carbon arc welding, they also became the "inventors of modern welding apparatus".

1885–1888: Karl Benz of Karlsruhe, Baden, German Empire introduces the Benz Patent Motorwagen, widely regarded as the first automobile. It featured wire wheels (unlike carriages' wooden ones) with a four-stroke engine of his own design between the rear wheels, with a very advanced coil ignition and evaporative cooling rather than a radiator. The Motorwagen was patented on January 29, 1886, as DRP-37435: "automobile fueled by gas". The 1885 version was difficult to control, leading to a collision with a wall during a public demonstration. The first successful tests on public roads were carried out in the early summer of 1886. The next year Benz created the Motorwagen Model 2 which had several modifications, and in 1887, the definitive Model 3 with wooden wheels was introduced, showing at the Paris Expo the same year. Benz began to sell the vehicle (advertising it as the Benz Patent Motorwagen) in the late summer of 1888, making it the first commercially available automobile in history.
1885–1887: William Stanley, Jr. of Brooklyn, New York, an employee of George Westinghouse, creates an improved transformer. Westinghouse had bought the patents of Lucien Gaulard and John Dixon Gibbs on the subject, and had purchased an option on the designs of Károly Zipernowsky, Ottó Bláthy and Miksa Déri. He entrusted engineer Stanley with the building of a device for commercial use. Stanley's first patented design was for induction coils with single cores of soft iron and adjustable gaps to regulate the EMF present in the secondary winding. This design was first used commercially in 1886. But Westinghouse soon had his team working on a design whose core comprised a stack of thin "E-shaped" iron plates, separated individually or in pairs by thin sheets of paper or other insulating material. Prewound copper coils could then be slid into place, and straight iron plates laid in to create a closed magnetic circuit. Westinghouse applied for a patent for the new design in December 1886; it was granted in July 1887.
1885–1889: , a French inventor, builds two small electric submarines. The first Goubet model was 16-feet long and weighed 2 tons. "She used accumulators (storage batteries which operated an Edison-type dynamo." While among the earliest submarines to successfully make use of electric power, she proved to have a severe flaw. She could not stay at a stable depth, set by the operator. The improved Goubet II was introduced in 1889. This version could transport a 2-man crew and had "an attractive interior". More stable than her predecessor, though still unable to stay at a set depth.
1885–1887: Thorsten Nordenfelt of Örby, Uppsala Municipality, Sweden produces a series of steam powered submarines. The first was the Nordenfelt I, a 56 tonne, 19.5 metre long vessel similar to George Garrett's ill-fated Resurgam (1879), with a range of 240 kilometres and armed with a single torpedo and a 25.4 mm machine gun. It was manufactured by Bolinders in Stockholm in 1884–1885. Like the Resurgam, it operated on the surface using a 100 HP steam engine with a maximum speed of 9 kn, then it shut down its engine to dive. She was purchased by the Hellenic Navy and was delivered to Salamis Naval Base in 1886. Following the acceptance tests, she was never used again by the Hellenic Navy and was scrapped in 1901. Nordenfelt then built the Nordenfelt II (Abdülhamid) in 1886 and Nordenfelt III (Abdülmecid) in 1887, a pair of 30 metre long submarines with twin torpedo tubes, for the Ottoman Navy. Abdülhamid became the first submarine in history to fire a torpedo while submerged under water. The Nordenfelts had several faults. "It took as long as twelve hours to generate enough steam for submerged operations and about thirty minutes to dive. Once underwater, sudden changes in speed or direction triggered—in the words of a U.S. Navy intelligence report—"dangerous and eccentric movements." ...However, good public relations overcame bad design: Nordenfeldt always demonstrated his boats before a stellar crowd of crowned heads, and Nordenfeldt's submarines were regarded as the world standard."
1886–1887: Carl Gassner of Mainz, German Empire receives a patent for a zinc–carbon battery, among the earliest examples of dry cell batteries. Originally patented in the German Empire, Gassner also received patents from Austria-Hungary, Belgium, the French Third Republic, the United Kingdom of Great Britain and Ireland (all in 1886) and the United States (in 1887). Consumer dry cells would first appear in the 1890s. In 1887, Wilhelm Hellesen of Kalundborg, Denmark patented his own zinc–carbon battery. Within the year, Hellesen and V. Ludvigsen founded a factory in Frederiksberg, producing their batteries.
1886: Charles Martin Hall of Thompson Township, Geauga County, Ohio, and Paul Héroult of Thury-Harcourt, Normandy independently discover the same inexpensive method for producing aluminium, which became the first metal to attain widespread use since the prehistoric discovery of iron. The basic invention involves passing an electric current through a bath of alumina dissolved in cryolite, which results in a puddle of aluminum forming in the bottom of the retort. It has come to be known as the Hall-Héroult process. Often overlooked is that Hall did not work alone. His research partner was Julia Brainerd Hall, an older sister. She had studied chemistry at Oberlin College, helped with the experiments, took laboratory notes and gave business advice to Charles.
1886–1890: Herbert Akroyd Stuart of Halifax Yorkshire, England receives his first patent on a prototype of the hot bulb engine. His research culminated in an 1890 patent for a compression ignition engine. Production started in 1891 by Richard Hornsby & Sons of Grantham, Lincolnshire, England under the title Hornsby Akroyd Patent Oil Engine under licence. Stuart's oil engine design was simple, reliable and economical. It had a comparatively low compression ratio, so that the temperature of the air compressed in the combustion chamber at the end of the compression stroke was not high enough to initiate combustion. Combustion instead took place in a separated combustion chamber, the "vaporizer" (also called the "hot bulb") mounted on the cylinder head, into which fuel was sprayed. It was connected to the cylinder by a narrow passage and was heated either by the cylinder's coolant or by exhaust gases while running; an external flame such as a blowtorch was used for starting. Self-ignition occurred from contact between the fuel-air mixture and the hot walls of the vaporizer.
1887: William Thomson (later Baron Kelvin) of Belfast, Ireland introduces the multicellular voltmeter. The electrical supply industry needed instruments capable of measuring high voltages. Thomson's voltmeter could measure up to 20,000 volts. It could measure both direct current (DC) and alternating current (AC) flows. They went into production in 1888, being the first electrostatic voltmeters.
1887: Charles Vernon Boys of Wing, Rutland, England introduces a method of using fused quartz fibers to measure "delicate forces". Boys was a physics demonstrator at the Royal College of Science in South Kensington, but was contacting private experiments on the effects of delicate forces on objects. It was already known that hanging an object from a thread could demonstrate the effects of such weak influences. Said thread had to be "thin, strong and elastic". Finding the best fibers available at the time insufficient for his experiments, Boys set out to create a better fiber. He tried making glass from a variety of minerals. The best results came from natural quartz. He created fibers both extremely thin and highly durable. He used them to create the "radiomicrometer", a device sensitive enough to detect the heat of a single candle from a distance of almost 2 miles. By March 26, 1887, Boys was reporting his results to the Physical Society of London.
1887–1888: Augustus Desiré Waller of Paris recorded the human electrocardiogram with surface electrodes. He was employed at the time as a lecturer in physiology at St Mary's Hospital in Paddington, London, England. In May, 1887, Waller demonstrated his method to many physiologists. In 1888, Waller demonstrated that the contraction of the heart started at the apex of the heart and ended at the base of the heart. Willem Einthoven was among those who took interest in the new method. He would end up improving it in the 1900s.
1887–1889: The Serbian-American engineer Nikola Tesla files patents on a rotating magnetic field based alternating current induction motor and related polyphase AC transmission systems. The patents are licensed by Westinghouse Electric although technical problems and a shortage of cash at the company meant a complete system would not be rolled out until 1893.
1887–1890: Sebastian Ziani de Ferranti of Liverpool, England is hired by the London Electric Supply Corporation to design the Deptford Power Station. Ferranti designed the building, as well as the electrical systems for both generating and distributing alternating current (AC). Among the innovations included in the Station was "the use of 10,000-volt high-tension cable", successfully tested for safety. On its completion in October 1890 it was the first truly modern power station, supplying high-voltage AC power. "Ferranti pioneered the use of Alternating Current for the distribution of electrical power in Europe authoring 176 patents on the alternator, high-tension cables, insulation, circuit breakers, transformers and turbines."
1888: Heinrich Hertz of Hamburg, a city-state of the German Empire, successfully transmits and receives radio waves. He was employed at the time by the Karlsruhe Institute of Technology. Attempting to experimentally prove James Clerk Maxwell' "A dynamical theory of the electromagnetic field" (1864), Hertz "generated electric waves using an electric circuit". Then he detected said waves "with another similar circuit some distance away". Hertz succeeded in proving the existence of electromagnetic waves. But in doing so, he had built basic transmitter and receiver devices. Hertz took this work no further, did not exploit it commercially, and famously did not consider it useful. But it was an important step in the invention of radio.
1888–1890: Isaac Peral of Cartagena, Spain launches his pioneering submarine on September 8, 1888. Created for the Spanish Navy, el Peral was "roughly 71 feet long, with a 9-foot beam and a height of almost 9 feet amidships, with one horizontal and two small vertical propellers, Peral's "cigar," as the workers called it, ... had a periscope, a chemical system to oxygenate the air for a crew of six, a speedometer, spotlights, and a launcher at the bow capable of firing three torpedoes. Its two 30-horsepower electrical motors, powered by 613 batteries, gave it a theoretical range of 396 nautical miles and a maximum speed of 10.9 knots an hour at the surface." It underwent a series of trials in 1889 and 1890, all in the Bay of Cádiz. On June 7, 1890, it "successfully spent an hour submerged at a depth of 10 meters, following a set course of three and a half miles". He was celebrated by the public and honored by Maria Christina of Austria, Queen Regent of Spain. But Navy officials ultimately declared the submarine a "useless curiosity", scrapping the project.
1888–1890: Gustave Zédé and Arthur Constantin Krebs launch the Gymnote, a 60-foot submarine for the French Navy. "It was driven by a 55 horse power electric motor, originally powered by 564 Lalande-Chaperon alkaline cells by Coumelin, Desmazures et Baillache with a total capacity of 400 Amphours weighing 11 tons and delivering a maximum current of 166 Amps." She was launched on 24 September 1888 and would stay in service to 1908. The Gymnote underwent various trials to 1890, successful enough for the Navy to start building two "real fighting submarines", considerably larger. Several of the trials were intended to established tactical methods of using submarines in warfare. Several weapons were tested until it was decided that the torpedoes of Robert Whitehead were ideal for the job. The Gymnote proved effective in breaking blockades and surface ships had trouble spotting it. She was able to withstand explosions of up to 220 pounds of guncotton in a distance of 75 yards from its body. Shells of quick-firing guns, fired at short range, would explode in the water before hitting it. At long-range everything fired at the submarine, ended up ricocheting. The submarine proved "blind" when submerged, establishing the need of a periscope.
1889–1891: Almon Brown Strowger of Penfield, New York, files a patent for the stepping switch on March 12, 1889. Issued on March 10, 1891, it enabled automatic telephone exchanges. Since 1878, telephone communications were handled by telephone switchboards, staffed by telephone operators. Operators were not only responsible for connecting, monitoring and disconnecting calls. They were expected to provide "emotional support, emergency information, local news and gossip, business tips", etc. Strowger had reportedly felt the negative side of this development, while working as an undertaker in Kansas City. The local operator happened to be the wife of a rival undertaker. Whenever someone asked to be put through to an undertaker, the operator would connect them to her husband. Strowger was frustrated at losing customers to this unfair competition. He created his device explicitly to bypass the need of an operator. His system "required users to tap out the number they wanted on three keys to call other users directly. The system worked with reasonable accuracy when the subscribers operated their push buttons correctly and remembered to press the release button after a conversation was finished, but there was no provision against a subscriber being connected to a busy line." Strowger would found the Strowger Automatic Telephone Exchange in 1891.
1889: Elihu Thomson of Manchester, England, United Kingdom of Great Britain and Ireland creates a motor-driven Wattmeter.
1889: Mikhail Dolivo-Dobrovolsky of Gatchina, Russian Empire created the first squirrel-cage induction motor. He was at the time working for AEG.
 Development and commercial production of gasoline-powered automobiles were undertaken by Karl Benz, Gottlieb Daimler and Maybach
 The first commercial production and sales of phonographs and phonograph recordings occurred.
 Steel frame construction of "sky-scrapers" happened for the first time.
 February 16, 1880: The American Society of Mechanical Engineers was founded in New York City.
 Construction began on the Panama Canal by the French. This was the first attempt to build the Canal; it would end in failure.
 Lewis Ticehurst invented the drinking straw.
 1884: Smokeless powder was brought from France.
 1885: Thomas Edison invents the first ever movie in Menlo Park, New Jersey.
 1886: Earliest commercial automobile is invented.
 1887: As the Prohibition movement gained nationwide prevalence, a "liquor-free" drink was brewed, known now as Coca-Cola.
 1888: Infrastructure reform movements begin when many cities are devastated by the Great Blizzard of '88.

Science
 Heinrich Hertz discovered the photoelectric effect.
 The Michelson–Morley experiment was undertaken, which suggested that the speed of light is invariant.
 The James–Lange theory of emotion was produced.
 William James publishes numerous articles on human thought, leading to the 1890 publication of his The Principles of Psychology.

Society
 About 600,000 Swedes Emigrated to America.
 Chinese, Scandinavians and Irish immigrants laid  of Railroad tracks in America.
 Syrian Canadians started immigrating to the Americas.

Popular culture

Literature and arts
 Friedrich Nietzsche published Thus Spoke Zarathustra.
 Mark Twain published Adventures of Huckleberry Finn.
 Carlo Collodi published The Adventures of Pinocchio.
 Fyodor Dostoevsky wrote The Brothers Karamazov.
 Edward Bellamy published Looking Backward.
 Robert Louis Stevenson published Treasure Island and The Strange Case of Dr Jekyll and Mr Hyde.
 Arthur Conan Doyle published his first Sherlock Holmes tale.
 African-American music and ragtime rise to popularity in the later part of the decade.
 Guy de Maupassant wrote The Necklace.
 Henrik Ibsen published Ghosts

Architecture

 Home Insurance Building, the first skyscraper in history, becomes the tallest man-made structure ever built after it officially opened in 1885.
 March 31, 1889 – The Eiffel Tower is inaugurated (opens May 6). At 300 m, its height exceeds the previous tallest structure in the world by 130 m.

Sports

Music

Especially the romantic dominated during this time period. The only other music forms during this time was the beginning of music styles like Expressionism. The romantic movement was meant to oppose the Industrial Revolution. The music also being in direct opposition to its prior styles like classic music. It was meant to stop the political and societal, by giving life a little bit of “magic” and “mysticism”. Generally it was against rational thinking and understanding in the world and wanted to replace it with Emotions like love. The music mostly consisted of musical pieces composed in harmonic structure. 
Johannes Brahms 1885

Fashion

Other

 8 May 1886 — Coca-Cola was invented.
 1888 — Whitechapel murders by the infamous Jack the Ripper.

People

Politics
 Eugène Borel, Director Universal Postal Union
 Louis Curchod, Director International Telecommunication Union
 Henri Morel, Secretary-general World Intellectual Property Organization
 Gustave Moynier, President International Committee of the Red Cross
 Heinrich Wild, President World Meteorological Organization

Sports Figures
 Cap Anson
 Moses Fleetwood Walker
 John L. Sullivan
 Jim Adams
 John Ake
 Pete Browning
 William Ahearn

Famous and infamous personalities
 Wyatt Earp, lawman 
 Morgan Earp, lawman
 Virgil Earp, lawman
 Doc Holliday, outlaw and gunfighter, friend of Wyatt Earp
 Tom McLaury, Wild West, outlaw, cowboy, cattle rustler
 Frank McLaury, ranch hand, outlaw
 Billy Claiborne, outlaw Cowboy, gunfighter
 Curly Bill Brocius, outlaw Cowboy, rustler
 Buffalo Bill, scout, bison and buffalo hunter, founder of Buffalo Bill's Wild West
 Billy the Kid, a.k.a. Henry McCarty, Wild West, outlaw, murderer
 Ignacy Hryniewiecki, assassin of Tsar Alexander II of Russia
 Bob Ford, Wild West, outlaw, murderer of Jesse James

References

Further reading
 The American Annual Cyclopedia and Register of Important Events of the Year 1881
 The American Annual Cyclopedia and Register of Important Events of the Year 1882
 The American Annual Cyclopedia and Register of Important Events of the Year 1884 
 The American Annual Cyclopedia and Register of Important Events of the Year 1887
 The American Annual Cyclopedia and Register of Important Events of the Year 1888
 Prices and Wages by Decade, 1880–1889 – Guide published by the University of Missouri Library points to pages in digital libraries (freely available online) that show average prices and wages by occupation, race, sex, and more.

 
1880s decade overviews